Herero may refer to:

 Herero people, a people belonging to the Bantu group, with about 240,000 members alive today
 Herero language, a language of the Bantu family (Niger-Congo group)
 Herero and Namaqua Genocide
 Herero chat, a species of bird in the family Muscicapidae
 Herero Day, a gathering of the Herero people of Namibia to commemorate their deceased chieftains
 Herero Mall, an informal business area in the Katutura suburb of Windhoek, the capital of Namibia
 Herero Wars, a series of colonial wars between the German Empire and the Herero people of German South-West Africa (1904–1908)

Language and nationality disambiguation pages